This is an incomplete list of Prisoner of War (POW) Camps located in the United Kingdom during World War II.

German POWs in England were graded as follows: "Grade A (white) were considered anti-Nazi; Grade B (grey) had less clear feelings and were considered not as reliable as the 'whites'; Grade C (black) had probable Nazi leanings; Grade C+ (also Black) were deemed ardent Nazis."

Some camps were classed as General Processing Camps (abbreviated GPC in the table).

There was a large amount of renaming, renumbering and reuse of camp numbers during World War II. The reason for this is unknown but speculation has it that it was to confuse the Axis powers in the event of any attempted breakouts after any potential Paratrooper attack or invasion. Examples:No. 286 Purfleet Camp, Beacon Hill, Purfleet, EssexNo. 654 Purfleet Camp, No.4 Transit Camp, Beacon Hill, Purfleet, EssexNo. 655 Purfleet Camp, No.1 Transit Camp, Beacon Hill, Purfleet, Essex

List

References

External links 
 Churchill's Unexpected Guests (History Press, 2013)
  Prisoner of War Camps 1939-1948, Roger JC Thomas, 2003, English Heritage (accessed September 18, 2007).
 The Forgotten History of Yorkshire's WWII Prisoner of War Camps
 Ganger Camp 41 at Woodley, Romsey, Hampshire
 Island Farm Prisoner of War Camp: No. 198
 Lodge Farm POW Camp No. 25

United Kingdom
 
Prisoner of war camps